Events from the year 1929 in the United States.

Incumbents

Federal Government 
 President: Calvin Coolidge (R-Massachusetts) (until March 4), Herbert Hoover (R-California) (starting March 4)
 Vice President: Charles G. Dawes (R-Illinois) (until March 4), Charles Curtis (R-Kansas) (starting March 4)
 Chief Justice: William Howard Taft (Ohio)
 Speaker of the House of Representatives: Nicholas Longworth (R-Ohio)
 Senate Majority Leader: Charles Curtis (R-Kansas) (until March 4), James Eli Watson (R-Indiana) (starting March 4)
 Congress: 70th (until March 4), 71st (starting March 4)

Events

January–March

 January 1 – In college football, California loses to the Georgia Tech Yellow Jackets in the 27th Rose Bowl by a score of 8–7.
 January 29 – The Seeing Eye is established with the mission to train guide dogs to assist the blind, by Dorothy Harrison Eustis and Morris Frank in Nashville, Tennessee.
 February 11 – Eugene O'Neill's Dynamo premieres in New York.
 February 14 – St. Valentine's Day Massacre: Seven gangsters, rivals of Al Capone, are murdered in Chicago.
 February 26 – The Grand Teton National Park in Wyoming is established by Congress.
 March 2 – The longest bridge in the world, the San Francisco Bay Toll-Bridge, opens.
 March 4 – Herbert Hoover is sworn in as the 31st President of the United States, and Charles Curtis is sworn in as Vice President of the United States.
 March 16 – A part-talkie film version of Show Boat, based on Edna Ferber's novel rather than the musical, premieres in Palm Beach (starring Laura La Plante and Joseph Schildkraut). It is critically panned and not successful at the box office.

April–June
 April 2-6 – The Bombing of Naco by Irish pilot Patrick Murphy, the first aerial assault on the United States by a foreign combatant 
 May 13 – The National Crime Syndicate is founded in Atlantic City.
 May 15 – Cleveland Clinic Fire of 1929
 A leak and explosion of methyl chloride refrigerant in a Cleveland hospital kills one hundred and twenty-eight and becomes regarded as the catalyst for the development of chlorofluorocarbon refrigerants.
 May 16 – The 1st Academy Awards are presented at the Hollywood Roosevelt Hotel in Hollywood, California, with William A. Wellman's Wings winning Academy Award for Best Picture. Joseph W. Farnham wins the only award ever given for Best Writing, Title Writing. Frank Borzage's 7th Heaven received the most nominations with five, while both it and F. W. Murnau's Sunrise jointly  received the most awards with three.
 May 17 – Al Capone and his bodyguard are arrested for concealing deadly weapons.
 May 20 – The Wickersham Commission begins its investigation of alcohol prohibition in the United States.
 May 27 – United States v. Schwimmer decided in the Supreme Court affirms that pacifism is sufficient ground to deny an applicant citizenship of the United States.
 June 12 – Lou Hoover has tea at the White House with Jessie De Priest, wife of Oscar De Priest, the first black congressman of the 20th century.
 June 16 – Otto E. Funk, 62, ends his marathon walk (New York City to San Francisco, 4,165 miles in 183 days).
 June 21 – An agreement brokered by U.S. Ambassador Dwight Whitney Morrow ends the Cristero War in Mexico.
 June 27 – The first public demonstration of color television is held, by H. E. Ives and his colleagues at Bell Telephone Laboratories in New York City. The first images are a bouquet of roses and an American flag. A mechanical system is used to transmit 50-line color television images between New York and Washington, D.C.

July–September
 August 11 – The first Bud Billiken Parade and Picnic, the oldest and largest US African-American parade, is held in Chicago.
 August 19 – The radio comedy show Amos and Andy makes its debut, starring Freeman Gosden and Charles Correll.
 August 31 – The Young Plan, which sets the total World War I reparations owed by Germany at US$26,350,000,000 to be paid over a period of 58½ years, is finalized.
 September 3 – The Dow Jones Industrial Average (DJIA) peaks at 381.17, a height it will not reach again until November 1954.

October–December

 October 11 – J. C. Penney opens Store #1252 in Milford, Delaware, making it a nationwide company with department stores in all 48 states.
 October 14 – The Philadelphia Athletics defeat the Chicago Cubs, 4 games to 1, to win their 4th World Series Title.
 October 24–October 29 – Wall Street Crash of 1929: Three multi-digit percentage drops wipe out more than $30 billion from the New York Stock Exchange (10 times greater than the annual budget of the federal government).
 October 24 – The Mount Hope Bridge, connecting Portsmouth to Bristol in Rhode Island, opens to traffic.
 October 25 – Former U.S. Interior Secretary Albert B. Fall is convicted of bribery for his role in the Teapot Dome scandal, becoming the first Presidential cabinet member to go to prison for actions in office.
 November 7 – The Museum of Modern Art in New York City opens to the public.
 November 15 – The Ambassador Bridge, connecting Detroit, Michigan, to Windsor, Ontario, opens to traffic.
 November 29 – Bernt Balchen, U.S. Admiral Richard Byrd, Captain Ashley McKinley, and Harold June, become the first to fly over the South Pole.
 December 3 – Great Depression: U.S. President Herbert Hoover announces to the U.S. Congress that the worst effects of the recent stock market crash are behind the nation, and that the American people have regained faith in the economy.

Undated
 Sunglasses mass-produced from celluloid are first made by Foster Grant for sale in Austin Texas

Ongoing
 Lochner era (c. 1897–c. 1937)
 On the roof gang, group of cryptologists and radiomen during World War II (1928–1941)
 U.S. occupation of Haiti (1915–1934)
 Prohibition (1920–1933)
 Roaring Twenties (1920–1929)

Sport 
March 29 - For the first time in Stanley Cup history two American teams face off for hockey's ultimate prize when the Boston Bruins defeat the New York Rangers 2 games to 0 for the Bruins first Stanley Cup victory. The deciding game is played in New York City's Madison Square Garden.

Births

January

 January 1 – Joseph Lombardo, American mafioso (d. 2019)
 January 3 
 Marilyn Lloyd, American politician and businesswoman (d. 2018)
 Gordon Moore, American computing entrepreneur and benefactor
 January 4 – Darrell Mudra, American football coach (d. 2022)
 January 5 
 Wilbert Harrison, American singer-songwriter and guitarist (d. 1994)
 Robert K. Massie, American journalist and historian (d. 2019) 
 January 9 – Tom Riley, American lawyer and politician (d. 2011)
 January 13 
 Joe Pass, American jazz guitarist (d. 1994)
 Moe Savransky, American baseball player (d. 2022)
 January 14 – Billy Walker, American country music singer (d. 2006)
 January 15 – Martin Luther King Jr., African-American civil rights leader, Nobel laureate (d. 1968)
 January 17
 Eilaine Roth, American professional baseball player (d. 2011)
 Elaine Roth, American professional baseball player (d. 2007)
 January 19 – Red Amick, American race car driver (d. 1995)  
 January 20
 January 20
 Jimmy Cobb, American jazz drummer (d. 2020)
 Arte Johnson, American comedian and actor (d. 2019)
 Frank Kush, American football player and coach (d. 2017) 
 January 21 – Rolando Hinojosa-Smith, writer and literary scholar (d. 2022) 
 January 27 – Richard Ottinger, American politician

February

 February 1 – Stuart Whitman, American film, television actor (d. 2020)
 February 2 – John Henry Holland, American computer scientist (d. 2015)
 February 3 – Huntington Hardisty, American admiral (d. 2003)
 February 4
 Jerry Adler, American actor
 Stanley Drucker, American clarinetist (d. 2022)
 Thomas H. Paterniti, American politician (d. 2017)
 February 5 – Hal Blaine, American drummer and session musician (d. 2019)
 February 6 – Chuck Nergard, American politician (d. 2017)
 February 10
 Jerry Goldsmith, American composer and conductor (d. 2004)
 Jim Whittaker, mountaineer 
 Lou Whittaker, mountaineer 
 February 14 
 Vic Morrow, American actor, director (d. 1982)
 James Nelligan, American politician 
 February 15 – James Schlesinger, American politician (d. 2014)
 February 22
 James Hong, Chinese-American actor, director
 Rebecca Schull, American actress
 February 28 – Hayden Fry, American football player and coach (d. 2019)

March

 March 1 – Lynwood E. Clark, American Air Force lieutenant general
 March 6 – Gale McArthur, American basketball player (d. 2020) 
 March 7 – Marion Marlowe, American singer and actress (d. 2012)
 March 8 
 Elaine Edwards, American politician (d. 2018)
 Nicodemo Scarfo, American mafioso (d. 2017) 
 March 9 – Jay Weston, American film producer and restaurant critic (d. 2023) 
 March 11 – Hugh Newell Jacobsen, American architect (d. 2021)
 March 13
 Peter Breck, American actor (d. 2012 in Canada)
 Joseph Mascolo, American musician, actor (d. 2016)
 March 14 
 Michael D. Coe, archaeologist, anthropologist, epigrapher and author (d. 2019) 
 Bob Goalby, golfer (d. 2022)
 March 16 – Betty Johnson, singer
 March 17 – Howie Winter, gang boss (d. 2020)
 March 19 – Michael M. Ryan, American actor (d. 2017)
 March 25 
 Harris W. Fawell, American politician (d. 2021)
 Cecil Taylor, African-American jazz pianist, composer, and poet (d. 2018)
 March 26 – Edward Sorel, American illustrator and caricaturist 
 March 27 
 Rita Briggs, American baseball player (d. 1994)
 Don Warden, American country musician and manager (d. 2017)
 March 29 – Richard Lewontin, American biologist, geneticist and academic 
 March 31 – Bert Fields, American lawyer and author

April

 April 1
 Jane Powell, actress, singer, dancer (d. 2021)
 Bo Schembechler, American football player and coach (d. 2006)
 April 2 
 Ed Dorn, poet (d. 1999)
 Frank Farrar, governor of South Dakota (d. 2021)
 April 4
 William F. Clinger Jr., politician (d. 2021)
 John Dee Holeman, Piedmont Blues musician (d. 2021)
 April 5 – Richard Jenrette, businessman (d. 2018)
 April 8 – Morton B. Panish, physical chemist
 April 9 – Paule Marshall, born Valenza Pauline Burke, novelist (d. 2019)
 April 12
 Tony Douglas, country music singer (d. 2013)
 Dale Haupt, American football coach (d. 2018)
 April 13 – Yvonne Clark, engineer (d. 2019)
 April 16
 Dorne Dibble, American football player (d. 2018)
 Roy Hamilton, African-American singer (d. 1969)
 April 20 – John Andreason, politician (d. 2017)
 April 27 – Michael Harner, anthropologist, author (d. 2018)  
 April 29
 Tom Cornsweet, psychologist (d. 2017)
 Billy Mize, steel guitarist, band leader, vocalist, songwriter, TV show host (d. 2017)

May

 May 2 – Link Wray, rock and roll musician (d. 2005)
 May 3 
 Denise Lor, popular music singer, actress (d. 2015)
 Emily Anne Staples, politician (d. 2018)
 May 4
 Audrey Hepburn, Belgian-born actress and humanitarian (d. 1993 in Switzerland)
 Sydney Lamb, American linguist
 Paige Rense, American writer and editor (d. 2021)
 May 5 – Ilene Woods, American singer, actress (d. 2010)
 May 6 – Paul Lauterbur, American chemist, Nobel laureate (d. 2007)
 May 7
 Sally Liberman Smith, educator (d. 2007)
 Dick Williams, American baseball player (d. 2011)
 May 8
 Ethel D. Allen, African-American Secretary of the Commonwealth of Pennsylvania and physician (d. 1981)
 John C. Bogle, American investor (d. 2019)
 Jane Roberts, American writer (d. 1984)
 May 10 – Betty Foss, American female professional baseball player (d. 1998)
 May 11 – Margaret Kerry, American actress, dancer, and motivational speaker
 May 15 – Frank Heart, American computer engineer (d. 2018)
 May 16
 Betty Carter, African-American jazz singer (d. 1998)
 John Conyers, African-American politician
 Adrienne Rich, American poet, essayist (d. 2012)
 May 18 – Walter Pitman, American educator, politician (d. 2018)
 May 22 – Neave Brown, American-British architect (d. 2018)
 May 25 – Beverly Sills, American operatic soprano, director of the New York City Opera (d. 2007)
 May 27 – Thomas E. Brennan, American jurist (d. 2018)
 May 30 – Marshall Loeb, American business journalist (d. 2017)

June

 June 1 
 James H. Billington, American academic and author (d. 2018)
 Chuck Ortmann, American football player (d. 2018) 
 June 2 – Norton Juster, American writer and academic  (d. 2021) 
 June 3 – Chuck Barris, American television game show host, producer (d. 2017)
 June 6 – Mary Hatcher, American soprano, actress (d. 2018)
 June 8 – Marion Marshall, American actress (d. 2018) 
 June 9 – Johnny Ace, African-American rhythm and blues singer (d. 1954)
 June 10
 James McDivitt, American astronaut (d. 2022)
 Grace Mirabella, American fashion journalist (d. 2021)
 E. O. Wilson, American biologist (d. 2021)
 June 11 – Frank Thomas, American baseball player (d. 2023)
 June 16 – Paul Cain, American Pentecostal Christian evangelist (d. 2019)
 June 20 – Bonnie Bartlett, American actress
 June 21 
 Bob Gain, American football player (d. 2016)
 Stephen B. Wiley, American politician (d. 2015)
 June 22 – Alex P. Garcia, American politician (d. 1999)
 June 23
 June Carter Cash, American singer (d. 2003)
 Gail Peters, American competition swimmer
 Gerald Eustis Thomas, American naval officer, diplomat and academic (d. 2019)
 June 24
 Vic Carrabotta, American comic-book artist, advertising art director (d. 2022)
 Connie Hall, American country music singer (d. 2021)
 Carolyn S. Shoemaker, American astronomer
 June 25 – Eric Carle, American designer, illustrator and writer (d. 2021)
 June 26 – Milton Glaser, American graphic designer, illustrator and teacher (d. 2020)
 June 27 – J. C. Duncan, politician
 June 28 – Glenn D. Paige, political scientist (d. 2017)
 June 29
 Pat Crawford Brown, actress (d. 2019)  
 Pete George, weightlifter

July

 July 1 – Gerald Edelman, American biologist, Nobel laureate (d. 2014)
 July 3
 Joanne Herring, American socialite, businesswoman, political activist, philanthropist, diplomat, and former television talk show host
 Lavelle White, American Texas blues and soul blues singer, songwriter
 July 4 
 Peter Angelos, American trial lawyer
 Bill Tremel, American professional baseball player (d. 2013)
 July 5 – Katherine Helmond, American actress (d. 2019)
 July 6 – Angelo LiPetri, American former professional baseball player (d. 2016)
 July 8 – Shirley Ann Grau, American writer (d. 2020)
 July 9 – Jesse McReynolds, American bluegrass musician
 July 11 – Sandy Frank, American television producer, distributor, and marketer of TV shows 
 July 14 – Pat Scott, American pitcher (d. 2016)
 July 15 – Walter Hirsch, American basketball player (d. 2022) 
 July 17 – Arthur Frommer, American writer, publisher and consumer advocate
 July 18 – Dick Button, American figure skater
 July 19 – Alice Pollitt, American female professional baseball player (d. 2016)
 July 21
 Antonia Handler Chayes, American lawyer, educator
 Paul V. Gadola, American judge (d. 2014)
 July 23 – Robert Quackenbush, American author and children's illustrator (d. 2021)
 July 26 – Patrick Flores, American Roman Catholic prelate (d. 2017)
 July 28 – Jacqueline Kennedy Onassis, American socialite, conservationist, 35th First Lady of the United States (d. 1994)
 July 31 – Don Murray, American actor

August

 August 1 – Samuel Charters, American writer, music historian and record producer (d. 2015)
 August 2 – Irwin Fridovich, American biochemist (d. 2019)
 August 4 –  Joe Pignatano, American baseball player and coach (d. 2022)
 August 7
 Jo Baer, American artist
 Don Larsen, American baseball player (d. 2020)
 Richard T. Schulze, politician 
 August 9 – Fred Fredericks, cartoonist (d. 2015)
 August 10 – Vincent McEveety, director, producer (d. 2018)
 August 12 – Buck Owens, singer, bandleader, and TV host (d. 2006)
 August 13 – Pat Harrington Jr., voice actor (d. 2016)
 August 14
 Thomas Meehan, playwright (d. 2017)
 Louise Slaughter, politician (d. 2018)
 August 15
 Louise Shivers, writer (d. 2014)
 Marcia Hafif, painter (d. 2018)
 August 16 – Fritz Von Erich, wrestler (d. 1997)
 August 17 – Francis Gary Powers, U-2 spy plane pilot (d. 1977)
 August 21 – Marie Severin, comics artist and colorist (d. 2018)
 August 23 – Vera Miles, American actress 
 August 24 – Betty Dodson, American sex educator (d. 2020)  
 August 26 – Chuck Renslow, American businessman, LGBT activist (d. 2017)
 August 27 – Ralph T. Coe, American art historian of Native American art (d. 2010)
 August 28 – Roxie Roker, African-American actress (d. 1995)
 August 29 – Yale Kamisar, American legal scholar (d. 2022)
 August 31 – C. C. Torbert Jr., American jurist (d. 2018)

September

 September 1 – Murray Fromson, American journalist (d. 2018)
 September 2 – Hal Ashby, American film director and editor (d. 1988)
 September 3 – Whitey Bulger, Irish-American gangster and multiple murderer (d. 2018)
 September 4 – Thomas Eagleton, American politician (d. 2007)
 September 5 – Bob Newhart, American comedian, actor
 September 6 – Dow Finsterwald, American professional golfer (d. 2022)
 September 9 – Stanford Parris, American lawyer and politician (d. 2010)
 September 10 – Arnold Palmer, American professional golfer (d. 2016)
 September 11
 Eve Brent, American actress (d. 2011)
 David S. Broder, American journalist (d. 2011)
 September 12 – Harvey Schmidt, American composer (d. 2018)
 September 14
 Larry Collins, American writer (d. 2005)
 John Gutfreund, American banker, businessman and investor (d. 2016)
 Mel Hancock, American politician (d. 2011)
 September 15 – Murray Gell-Mann, American physicist, Nobel laureate (d. 2019)
 September 16
 Dale Kildee, American politician 
 Maxine Kline, American female professional baseball player
 September 19
 Marge Roukema, American politician (d. 2014)
 Mel Stewart, African-American actor (d. 2002)
 September 20 – Anne Meara, American actress, comedian (d. 2015)
 September 22 – William E. Dannemeyer, American politician 
 September 25
 Barbara Walters, American television journalist (d. 2022)
 Kevin White, American politician (d. 2012)
 September 26 – Meredith Gourdine, American athlete (d. 1998)
 September 28 – Skip Bafalis, American politician 
 September 30 – Helen M. Marshall, American politician (d. 2017)

October

 October 2 – Moses Gunn, African-American actor (d. 1993)
 October 4 
 Scotty Beckett, American actor (d. 1968)
 Leroy Van Dyke, American country music singer and guitarist 
 Judith Jarvis Thomson, American moral philosopher (d. 2020)
 October 5 – Richard F. Gordon Jr., American astronaut (d. 2017)
 October 8 – Arthur Bisguier, American chess Grandmaster, chess promoter, and writer (d. 2017)
 October 15 – Hubert Dreyfus, American philosopher (d. 2017)
 October 18 – Jay Last, American physicist (d. 2021)
 October 21 – Ursula K. Le Guin, American science fiction and fantasy author (d. 2018)
 October 22 – Patsy Elsener, American diver (d. 2019)
 October 24
 Jim Brosnan, American baseball player and sportscaster (d. 2014)
 George Crumb, American composer and educator (d. 2022)
 Gustav Ranis, American economist and academic (d. 2013)
Ronald E. Rosser, Medal of Honor recipient (d. 2020)
 October 25 
 LaDell Andersen, American college and basketball coach (d. 2019)
 David McReynolds, American political activist (d. 2018)
 October 26 – Roland Hemond, American baseball executive (d. 2021)
 October 28 – Mitchell Torok, American country music singer

November

 November 1 – Nicholas Mavroules, American politician (d. 2003)
 November 2
 Rachel Ames, American actress  
 Harold Farberman, American conductor, composer and percussionist (d. 2018)
 November 6 – June Squibb, American actress
 November 8
 Bert Berns, American songwriter, record producer (d. 1967)
 Bobby Bowden, American football player and coach
 November 9 – Severn Darden, American comedian, actor (d. 1995)
 November 11 – LaVern Baker, American singer (d. 1997)
 November 12 – Grace Kelly, American actress (d. 1982)
 November 13 – Fred Phelps, American pastor, activist (Westboro Baptist Church) (d. 2014)
 November 14 – Jimmy Piersall, American baseball player and sportscaster (d. 2017)
 November 15
 Ed Asner, American actor (d. 2021)
 Joe Hinton, African-American soul music singer (d. 1968)
 November 18 – John McMartin, American actor (d. 2016)
 November 23 
 Hal Lindsey, Christian evangelist
 Gloria Lynne, American jazz singer (d. 2013)
 Shirley Palesh, baseball player (d. 2017)
 November 24 – George Moscone, attorney, politician (d. 1978)
 November 26 – Betta St. John, actress, singer and dancer
 November 28
 Berry Gordy, African-American record producer, songwriter
 Frederick D. Reese, African-American civil rights activist (d. 2018)
 November 30
 Dick Clark, American television entertainer (d. 2012)
 Joan Ganz Cooney, television producer

December

 December 1 – David Doyle, American actor (d. 1997) 
 December 2
 Dan Jenkins, American journalist and author (d. 2019)
 Leon Litwack, American historian and author
 December 9 – John Cassavetes, American actor (d. 1989)
 December 17 – William Safire, American author, columnist, journalist, and presidential speechwriter (d. 2009)
 December 20 – David H. Gambrell, politician
 December 21 – Newton Morton, geneticist (d. 2018)
 December 23 – Chet Baker, jazz musician (d. 1988)
 December 26 – Kathleen Crowley, actress (d. 2017)
 December 29
 Theodore V. Buttrey Jr., American educator, classicist and numismatist (d. 2018)
 Susie Garrett, African-American actress (d. 2002)
 Matt "Guitar" Murphy, American blues musician (d. 2018)
 December 31 – Robert B. Silvers, American literary editor (d. 2017)

Deaths
 January 5 – Marc McDermott, actor (born 1871)
 January 13
 Wyatt Earp, gunfighter (born 1848)
 Emil Fuchs, sculptor and painter (born 1866 in Austria)
 January 15
 Leonard Cline, novelist, poet and journalist (born 1893; heart failure)
 George Cope, painter (born 1855)
 January 21 – Maria Taylor Beale, author (born 1849)
 January 30 – Franklin J. Drake, admiral (born 1846)
 February 4 – William Rankin Ballard, businessman (born 1847)
 February 11  – Frank Putnam Flint, U.S. Senator from California from 1905 to 1911 (born 1862)
 February 14 – Thomas Burke, sprinter (born 1875)
 February 18 – William Russell, silent film actor (born 1884)
 February 22 – Louise Upton Brumback, landscape painter (born 1867)
 February 24 
 Adaline Hohf Beery, songbook compiler (born 1859)
 Frank Keenan, actor (born 1858)
 February 27 – Briton Hadden, co-founder of Time magazine (born 1898)
 March 1 – Royal Hurlburt Weller, politician (born 1881)
 March 5 – David Dunbar Buick, inventor  (born 1854 in Scotland)
 March 6 – Moses E. Clapp, politician (born 1851)
 March 12 – Asa Griggs Candler, businessman and politician (born 1851)
 March 15 – Pinetop Smith, blues pianist (born 1904; shot in dancehall brawl)
 March 18 – William P. Cronan, Naval Governor of Guam (born 1879)
 March 28 – Katharine Lee Bates, librettist, author of "America the Beautiful" (born 1859)
 April 4 – William Michael Crose, United States Navy Commander and 7th Governor of American Samoa (born 1867)
 April 28 – May Jordan McConnel, Australian trade unionist and suffragist (born 1860)
 June 2 – Don Murray, jazz clarinettist (born 1894; auto accident)
 June 4 – Harry Frazee, Broadway producer and baseball owner (born 1881)
 June 5 – Adolph Coors, brewer (born 1847 in Prussia; suicide)
 June 9 – murder–suicide
 Louis Bennison, silent Western film actor (born 1884)
 Margaret Lawrence, actress (born 1889)
 June 11 – William D. Boyce, entrepreneur and founder of the Boy Scouts of America (born 1858)
 July 2 – Gladys Brockwell, film actress (born 1894; auto accident)
 July 3 – Dustin Farnum, silent Western film actor (born 1874)
 July 9 – Cack Henley, baseball player (born 1884)
 July 12 – Robert Henri, painter (born 1865)
July 20 – Noble Drew Ali, prophet (born 1886)
 August 3
 Emile Berliner, inventor (born 1851 in Hanover)
 Thorstein Veblen, economist (born 1857)
 August 19 – Chris Kelly, jazz trumpeter (born c.1890)
 August 27 – James Knox Taylor, official architect (born 1857)
 September 2 – Paul Leni, filmmaker (born 1885 in Germany)
 September 4 – Frederick Freeman Proctor, vaudeville impresario (born 1851)
 September 25 – Miller Huggins, baseball manager (born 1879)
 October 3 – Jeanne Eagels, actress (born 1890; addiction)
 October 15 – Annie Lowrie Alexander, physician and educator (born 1864)
 November 14 – Joe McGinnity, baseball player (born 1871)
 November 17 – Herman Hollerith, businessman and inventor (born 1860)
 November 24 – Raymond Hitchcock, actor and producer (born 1865)
 December 10 – Harry Crosby, publisher and poet (born 1898; suicide)
 December 19 – Blind Lemon Jefferson, blues musician (born 1893; heart failure)
 December 21 – I. L. Patterson, politician, 18th Governor of Oregon (born 1859)
 Undated
 Timothy Francis Donovan Aaron, New Jersey politician (born 1853)
 Adelaïde Alsop Robineau, ceramicist (born 1865)
 Dallas Lore Sharp, nature writer (born 1870)

See also
 1929 in American television
 List of American films of 1929
 Timeline of United States history (1900–1929)

References

External links
 
 

 
1920s in the United States
United States
United States
Years of the 20th century in the United States